Euclea flava is a moth in the family Limacodidae (the slug caterpillar moths). The species was first described by William Barnes  and James Halliday McDunnough in 1910.

The MONA or Hodges number for Euclea flava is 4695.

References

Further reading

 

Limacodidae
Articles created by Qbugbot
Moths described in 1910